Syed Sohail Abbas Shah is a Pakistani politician who is Minister Law & Parliamentary Affairs and Board of Revenue Government of Gilgit Baltistan and member of the Gilgit Baltistan Assembly. He is son late Syed Jaffar Shah retired justice of Supereme Appellate Court Gilgit Baltistan. Late Syed Jaffar Shah was President of Pakistan Tehreek E Insaf Gilgit Baltistan chapter, Mr. Jaffar Shah died due to Covid-19 just few days  before general elections of Gilgit Baltistan.

Political career
Shah contested 2020 Gilgit-Baltistan Assembly by-election on 22 November 2020 from constituency GBA-3 (Gilgit-III) on the ticket from Pakistan Tehreek-e-Insaf candidate. He won GBA-3 (Gilgit-III) by the margin of 2,195 votes over the Independent runner up Muhammad Iqbal. He garnered 6,873 votes while Iqbal received 4,678 votes.

References

Living people
Gilgit-Baltistan MLAs 2020–2025
Politicians from Gilgit-Baltistan
Year of birth missing (living people)